The National Oil and Gas Authority was the governmental body in Bahrain responsible for developing and implementing the government policy for exploiting the country's oil and gas resources.

Nogaholding was established in August 2007 as a subsidiary unit of NOGA. Nogaholding was intended to concentrate and refocus NOGA's oil, gas, and petrochemical development activities.

NOGA was abolished in September 2021, and all its activities, responsibilities, and personnel transferred to Bahrain's Ministry of Oil. Nogaholding became a semi-independent agency within the Ministry of Oil.

References

External links 
 Official website (Ministry of Oil and Gas)

Government ministries of Bahrain
Regulation in Bahrain
Energy regulatory authorities